Prosoplus endata is a species of beetle in the family Cerambycidae. It was described by McKeown in 1942. It is known from Australia.

References

-

Prosoplus
Beetles described in 1942